The Pacific Islands Rugby League Federation (PIRLF) is the governing body of rugby league in the South Pacific.

Papua New Guinea's Sports Minister Philemon Embel is the chairman of the PIRLF.

History

It was formed by the governing bodies of rugby league in Papua New Guinea (Papua New Guinea Rugby Football League), Tonga (Tonga National Rugby League), Samoa (Rugby League Samoa), Fiji (Fiji National Rugby League) and the Cook Islands (Cook Islands Rugby League Association) in December 2009 and affiliated to the Rugby League International Federation (RLIF).

See also

References

External links
 Rugby League International Federation 

Rugby league in Oceania
Rugby league governing bodies in Oceania
Sports organizations established in 2009
2009 establishments in Oceania